XHTMJ-FM is a noncommercial radio station on 99.1 FM in Tepatitlán de Morelos, Jalisco, known as Radio Aurora.

History
XHTMJ received its permit on April 16, 2007.

References

Radio stations in Jalisco